The Lithuanian Security Police (LSP), also known as Saugumas, was a local police force that operated in German-occupied Lithuania from 1941 to 1944, in collaboration with the occupational authorities. Collaborating with the Nazi Sipo (security police) and SD (intelligence agency of the SS), the unit was directly subordinate to the German Kripo (criminal police). The LSP took part in perpetrating the Holocaust in Lithuania, persecuting Polish resistance and communist underground.

Background and formation
When Soviet Union occupied Lithuania on 15 June 1940, the Lithuanian Ministry of Internal Affairs was liquidated and replaced by the Soviet NKVD. Many former employees of the Ministry were arrested and imprisoned as so-called enemies of the people. When Nazi Germany invaded Soviet Union on 22 June 1941, Lithuanians organized an anti-Soviet June Uprising in hopes that they could restore Lithuanian independence. Therefore, they started restoring pre-Soviet state institutions under the Provisional Government of Lithuania. On 24 June 1941, the Provisional Government recreated the pre-war Ministry of Internal Affairs with three departments – State Security, Police, and Prisons. The government asked all those who worked there prior to 15 June 1940 to report back for duty. Many of them were just released from Soviet prisons.

After the German take-over of Lithuania, it became apparent that the Germans had no intention to grant autonomy to Lithuania. Instead, on 25 July 1941, they established a civil administration known as Generalbezirk Litauen under Generalkommissar Adrian von Renteln, and the Provisional Government was dissolved on 5 August 1941. At the same time, the police and intelligence agencies recreated during the transitional period were found useful and were incorporated into the German security system. The former State Security Department was reorganised to the Lithuanian Security Police.

Organization

External structure
The police in German-occupied Lithuania consisted of separate German and Lithuanian units. The most important German police organizations were the SiPo (security police) and SD (security service), commanded by Karl Jäger and headquartered in Kaunas, and the public police. The major Lithuanian police organisations were the Public Police, Lithuanian Security and Criminal Police (combined at the end of 1942 into one force), Lithuanian Auxiliary Police Battalions (Lithuanian Schutzmannschaft), Railway Police and Fire Police. Lithuanian police organizations were subordinate to their respective German counterparts. Neighboring Latvia and Estonia did not have an equivalent to LSP.

The LSP was dependent on the German SiPo and SD. It had the authority to sentence suspects up to three years. Larger sentences had to be reviewed and approved by Karl Jäger who always increased the sentences. Wilhelm Fuchs, the new commander of Einsatzkommando 3, wanted to liquidate LSP and incorporate it into the German police, but Stasys Čenkus wrote him a letter defending LSP usefulness and it was left undisturbed.

Internal structure
He kept this position until the end of the German occupation. His deputy assistants were head of the Security Police Kazys Matulis and personal secretary Vytenis Stasiškis. Petras Pamataitis headed Criminal Police.

LSP had a staff of approximately 400 people, 250 of them in Kaunas and around another 130 in Vilnius. Many of its members came from the fascist Iron Wolf organisation. For comparison, as of December 1943, the German SiPo and SD had 112 employees in Kaunas and 40 employees in Vilnius. The combined Lithuanian Security and Criminal Police had 886 employees in 1943.

LSP was headquartered in Kaunas. The headquarters were divided onto several directories: Organization (recruitment and employee selection), Economical and Financial (general administration), and Information (collected reports from other departments and agencies, created registry of state enemies, organized archive).

LSP had six regional branches in Kaunas (headed by Albinas Čiuoderis), Vilnius (Aleksandras Lileikis), Šiauliai (Juozas Pakulis), Ukmergė (Aleksandras Braziukaitis), Marijampolė (Petras Banys) and Panevėžys (Antanas Liepa). Regional branches usually had seven commissariats:
 Guards' Commissariat – guarded buildings and prisons
 General Commissariat – general administrative functions
 Information Commissariat – screened applicants to governmental institutions, gathered operative information, created lists of state enemies, gathered information on political attitudes of local population, preparing reports and publications
 Communist Commissariat – gathered information on communists and Soviet partisans, arrested and interrogated suspects, recruited agents
 Polish Commissariat – investigated activities of illegal Polish organizations, arrested and interrogated suspects, recruited agents
 Commissariat of Ethnic Minorities – investigated activities of Russians, Belarusians and other ethnic minorities
 Reconnaissance Commissariat

Regional branches sometimes had different set of commissariats, for example Kaunas's branch had a separate commissariat for right-wing organizations.

Activities

Persecution of communists and Polish resistance
The initial task of LSP was identifying and arresting communists. During the first months of German occupation, the Communist Commissariat of the Vilnius branch, headed by Juozas Bagdonis, was especially active. This commissariat in documents of 1941 is sometimes referred to as the Communist-Jewish section. This commissariat was responsible for spying on, arresting and interrogating communists, members of Komsomol, former Soviet government workers, NKVD collaborators, Jews and supporters of Jews. In Kaunas, the LSP arrested about 200 communists; about 170 of them were on a list of known communists. On 26 June 1941, this group was transferred to the Seventh Fort and executed. The next day Germans forbade Lithuanians to order executions independently.

As the war continued, the focus shifted to operations against Soviet partisans and Polish resistance particularly active in eastern Lithuania. In February 1942, German SiPo and SD mandated registration of Polish intelligentsia (cf. proscription list).

Persecution of Jews

During the first weeks of German occupation, LSP was focused on persecuting communists regardless of their nationality. At that time, Jews were persecuted only if they were involved in communist activities. Members of LSP collected at least some evidence to support the charge. However, that quickly changed and Jews became persecuted because of their ethnicity. The LSP targeted Jews and suspected Jews, supporters of Jews, people evading imprisonment in the ghettos, escapees from ghettos, or those who violated the Nazi racial laws.

The activities of the LSP offices in major cities (Vilnius, Kaunas) and in the provinces differed in principle. The LSP officers in major cities would most often study more complicated cases of political and strategic character, thus not directly participating in mass killings of the Jews. After interrogations, the Jews were handed over either to the Gestapo or to another Lithuanian collaborationist force named Ypatingasis būrys, which then transported them to the mass murder site of Paneriai or to other places of mass execution. The LSP offices in the province took an active role in the Holocaust and, altogether, were more active. Here, the LSP officials would not only conduct the interrogations, but would also organize mass arrests, transport Jews to the venues of imprisonment or execution, and carry out the executions.

Postwar developments
At the end of the war many members of the Lithuanian Security Police fled to Western Europe, notably to Germany. In 1955, the former commander of its Vilnius branch, Aleksandras Lileikis, emigrated to the United States, where he obtained citizenship, of which he was stripped in 1996. In Lithuania, Lileikis's trial was postponed several times due to his poor health; he died at age 93 without trial. Lileikis gave interviews to the press and published a memoir Pažadinto laiko pėdsakais in which he denied any wrongdoing.

Kazys Gimžauskas, deputy of Lileikis, who returned to Lithuania after US authorities began to investigate him in 1996, was convicted in 2001 of participation in genocide. In 2006, Algimantas Dailidė was convicted in Lithuania of persecuting and arresting two Poles and 12 Jews while he was a member of Lithuanian Security Police.

See also
Lithuanian collaboration during World War II

References 

Generalbezirk Litauen
Law enforcement agencies of Lithuania
Lithuanian collaboration with Nazi Germany
Local participation in the Holocaust
The Holocaust in Lithuania